Rhopalophora tenuis is a species of beetle in the family Cerambycidae. It was described by Chevrolat in 1855.

References

tenuis
Beetles described in 1855